Augusta County Training School, also known as Cedar Green School, is a historic public school building located at Cedar Green, Augusta County, Virginia. It was built in 1938, and is a one-story, central-auditorium plan frame building with projecting classroom wings on each side of a recessed auditorium.  It features a projecting
entrance portico and steeply pitched roof in a vernacular Neo-Classical style. It opened as a "Training School," but was later used as an elementary school.  It was the first consolidated school larger than two rooms built for African American students in Augusta County. The American Legion purchased the building in 1966 and remodeled it for their lodge.

It was listed on the National Register of Historic Places in 1986.

References

School buildings on the National Register of Historic Places in Virginia
Neoclassical architecture in Virginia
School buildings completed in 1938
Schools in Augusta County, Virginia
National Register of Historic Places in Augusta County, Virginia
1938 establishments in Virginia